The National Historic Fleet is a list of historic ships and vessels located in the United Kingdom, under the National Historic Ships register. National Historic Ships UK is an advisory body which advises the Secretary of State for Culture, Media and Sport and other public bodies on ship preservation and funding priorities. As part of this remit, National Historic Ships maintains the National Register of Historic Vessels (NRHV), which as of September 2014 listed over 1,000 vessels. The National Historic Fleet is a sub-grouping of this register, the vessels included on this list are distinguished by:

Being of pre-eminent national or regional significance
Spanning the spectrum of UK maritime history
Illustrating changes in construction and technology
Meriting a higher priority for long term preservation

The National Historic Fleet may also include vessels from the National Small Boat Register which are a minimum of 50 years old and which fit the above criteria.

As of September 2014 there are 206 vessels on the register, including museum ships, those still in active or commercial service, and a number currently laid up. Some are being actively restored, others have an uncertain future.

See also
Barcelona Charter

Notes

References

Historic Fleet
Museum ships in the United Kingdom